Hypochaeris maculata is a species of flowering plant belonging to the family Asteraceae.

Its native range is Europe to Siberia and China.

Synonym:
 Trommsdorffia maculata (L.) Bernh.

References

maculata